Peter Mathias,  (10 January 1928 – 1 March 2016) was a British economic historian and the former Chichele Professor of Economic History at the University of Oxford. His research focused on the history of industry, business, and technology, both in Britain and Europe. He is most well known for his publication of The First Industrial Nation: an Economic History of Britain 1700–1914 (1969), which discussed not only the multiple factors that made industrialisation possible, but also how it was sustained.

Early life and education
Mathias was born in Freshford, Somerset to Jack Mathias (from Plymouth) and Marion (née) Love (from Wingfield).

He attended Colston's School and Bristol Grammar School where he became interested in history. In December 1945, he applied for a scholarship at King's College, Cambridge; instead he won an Exhibition at Jesus College, Cambridge, during summer 1946. However the college demanded that those coming up from school should have done military service before they arrived so he spent two years in the army as a conscript. At Cambridge, his tutor was the medievalist, Vivian Fisher, and the English economic historian, Charles Wilson. Mathias also spent the 1952–3 academic year at Harvard University, participating in the Research Center for Entrepreneurial History.

Academic career
He was elected a Research Fellow at Jesus College, Cambridge, when he published his first book on the brewing industry in England. The manuscript described the importance of the technical aspects of brewing and manufacturing to the developing of the industry as a whole. Mathias then went out to complete a textbook on the history of industrialisation in Britain, The First Industrial Nation (1969).

He was fellow of Queens' College, Cambridge, from 1955 to 1968, and later an Honorary Fellow from 1987. He was Chichele Professor of Economic History at the University of Oxford and fellow of All Souls College, Oxford. There, he was editor of the Cambridge Economic History of Europe and co-founded of The Journal of European Economic History. He left Oxford to become master of Downing College, Cambridge, from 1987 to 1995.

Outside of research and teaching, Mathias contributed to the academic community with his positions at the Economic History Society (EHS) and the International Economic History Association (IEHA). He joined the former in his final year of undergraduate work at Cambridge. He continued to work for the EHS as Reviews Editor, Assistant Editor (1955–), Treasurer (1968–88), and President (1989–92). Meanwhile, the IEHA emerged from conferences at the University of Stockholm, but expanded in the 1960s. Mathias also became a member of the Datini Institute in Prato, Italy in 1967, under the direction of Fernand Braudel and Federigo Melis.

Later life
After retiring in 1995, he continued on advising and researching. He was the international advisor to Keio University, Japan, and President of the Great Britain Sasakawa Foundation. For this work, he was granted the Order of the Rising Sun with Gold Rays in 2003.

In 1998, Mathias' Festschrift, From Family Firms to Corporate Capitalism: Essays in Business and Industrial History in Honour of Peter Mathias was published by his former students, Kristine Bruland and Patrick O'Brien. Another Festschrift was published in 2018 entitled Asia and the history of the international economy : essays in memory of Peter Mathias, edited by  A. J. H. Latham and Heita Kawakatsu.

Honours

Commonwealth honours
 Commonwealth honours

Foreign honours
 Foreign honours

Scholastic

 Chancellor, visitor, governor, rector and fellowships

Honorary degrees

Memberships and Fellowships

Works

 The Retailing Revolution: a History of Multiple Retailing in the Food Trades Based upon the Allied Suppliers Group of Companies (1967)
The First Industrial Nation: an Economic History of Britain 1700–1914 (1969)
 (edited with A.W.H. Pearsall), Shipping: a survey of historical records (1971)
 Science and Society 1600–1900 (1972)
The Transformation of England (1979)
 (edited with D. C. Coleman) Enterprise and history: essays in honour of Charles Wilson (1984)
 (edited with John A. Davis) The First Industrial Revolutions (1990)
 (edited with John A. Davis) Innovation and technology in Europe : from the eighteenth century to the present day (1991)
 (edited with John A. Davis) Enterprise and labour: from the eighteenth century to the present (1996)
 (edited with John A. Davis) International trade and British economic growth : from the eighteenth century to the present day (1996)

Notes

References
British Academy Fellows Archive

External links
 Interviewed by Alan Macfarlane 5 March 2008 and 23 September 2009 (video)

1928 births
2016 deaths
British historians
Fellows of All Souls College, Oxford
Fellows of Queens' College, Cambridge
Economic historians
Masters of Downing College, Cambridge
People educated at Bristol Grammar School
Chichele Professors of Economic History
People educated at Colston's School
Commanders of the Order of the British Empire
Fellows of the British Academy